Pablo Usoz Ciriza (born 31 December 1968) is a Spanish field hockey player and coach. He won a silver medal at the 1996 Summer Olympics in Atlanta. He also competed at the 1992 and 2000 Summer Olympics.

His father Luis Usoz was also an international and Olympic hockey player.

Notes

References

External links
 

1968 births
Living people
Field hockey players from Madrid
Spanish male field hockey players
Spanish field hockey coaches
Olympic field hockey players of Spain
Olympic silver medalists for Spain
Olympic medalists in field hockey
Field hockey players at the 1992 Summer Olympics
Field hockey players at the 1996 Summer Olympics
Field hockey players at the 2000 Summer Olympics
Medalists at the 1996 Summer Olympics
1990 Men's Hockey World Cup players
1998 Men's Hockey World Cup players
Spanish Olympic coaches
Spanish people of Basque descent
20th-century Spanish people